The International Anti-Corruption Conference (IACC) is a series of international conferences organised by the IACC Council, in association with local governments and organisations, with Transparency International as its secretariat. The conference was first held in 1983 in Washington D.C.,and the New York City Department of Investigation and has since been held every two years in a different country.

IACC has developed a number of global initiatives that run independently of the conference, such as Young Journalist Initiative, Social Entrepreneurs for Transparency, Journalists 4 Transparency, anti-corruption film festival, and the Fair Play music Anti-corruption competition.

Host cities 

The table below shows the location of each IACC since the conference was first held in 1983.

Summary of conferences

14th IACC 

The 14th IACC was held In Bangkok between 10 and 13 November 2010 with the theme “Restoring trust: Global action for transparency”. The conference was hosted jointly by the IACC Council, the National Anti-Corruption Commission, The Royal Thai Ministry of Justice and Transparency Thailand. Delegates from over 130 countries were present at the conference, which was also attended by the Prime Minister of Thailand Abhisit Vejjajiva, World Bank Managing Director Sri Mulyani Indrawati, Asian Development Bank President Haruhiko Kuroda and Transparency International chair Huguette Labelle.

The conference featured 40 workshop sessions structured around four identified global challenges:
 Restoring Trust for Peace and Security
 Fuelling Transparency and Accountability in the Natural Resources and Energy Markets
 Climate Governance: Ensuring a Collective Commitment
 Strengthening Global Action for an Accountable Corporate World
The conference concluded as all attending nations pledged to increase the intensity of anti-corruption initiatives, and to fully honour all existing anti-corruption agreements.

15th IACC 
The 15th IACC was held in Brasilia between 7 and 10 November 2012, with the theme "Mobilising people: connecting agents of change". The conference was organised by the IACC Council, with Transparency International as the secretariat and in association with the Brazilian Office of the Comptroller General (OCG), AMARRIBO Brazil and Instituto Ethos.

16th IACC 
The 16th IACC was held in Putraya between 2 and 4 September 2015, with the theme "Ending Impunity: People, Integrity, Action". The Conference was organised by the IACC Council, with Transparency International as the Secretariat in association with the Malaysian Anti-corruption Commission.

17th IACC 
The 17th IACC took place in Panama City between 1–4 December 2016, with the theme "Time for Justice, Equity, Security and Trust", The Conference was organised by the IACC Council, with Transparency International as the Secretariat in association with National authority for Transparency and access to Information ANTAI and TI National Chapter in Panama. The four-day conference was packed with opportunities for anti-corruption activists and experts to exchange, learn and enjoy through workshops and panels,  film screenings, plenaries, an evening networking events and an outdoor concert, the Fair Play Anti-corruption Music.

The conference featured 60 workshop sessions structured around four identified global challenges:
 Panama Papers
 Strong, resilient & ethical institutions
 Shielding Justice, Financial Integrity 
 People fighting Grand Corruption

18th IACC 
The 18th IACC was held in Copenhagen, Denmark on 22–24 October 2018.

19th IACC 
The 19th IACC was planned to be held in Seoul, Korea on 2–5 June 2020. In light of the pandemic of coronavirus disease 2019 (COVID-19), it was postponed to 1–4 December 2020. Although the South Korean government is still the host of the IACC, the Conference will take place virtually.

See also 
 Botswana Center for Public Integrity
 Corruption Watch (South Africa)
 ACCU Uganda

References

External links 
 iaccseries.org

Anti-corruption non-governmental organizations
Organizations established in 1983